is a Japanese voice actor best known as the voice of Fox McCloud in the Japanese version of Nintendo's Star Fox series and Super Smash Bros. series.  He was also the voice of Giru in Dragon Ball GT. He works at Aoni Production.

Notable roles

TV
Aoki Densetsu Shoot! (1993) - Teacher, Television Announcer, Unknown Player
Dragon Ball GT (1996) - Giru
Dragon Ball Kai (2009) - Doctor
Dragon Quest (xxxx) - Great Maze
One Piece (xxxx) - Carne
Sonic the Hedgehog (xxxx) - Ari Ram
Slam Dunk - (1993) Satoru Kakuta

Films 
Detective Conan: Crossroad in the Ancient Capital (2003) - Shichirou Washio

Video games 
Star Fox 64 (1997) - Fox McCloud, Leon Powalski, Caiman, Sarumarine Pilot
Star Fox: Assault (2005) - Leon Powalski
Super Smash Bros. series (xxxx) - Fox McCloud (Original and Melee), Leon Powalski (Brawl), Dr. Wright (Brawl)

Dubbing 
Thomas the Tank Engine & Friends (1990-2004) - BoCo (Season 2–3), Peter Sam (Season 4–7), additional voices (Season 1–7)

External links 

 Shinobu Satouchi - list of roles 
 

Japanese male video game actors
Japanese male voice actors
Living people
Place of birth missing (living people)
1958 births
20th-century Japanese male actors
21st-century Japanese male actors
Aoni Production voice actors